Oro Viliyum Kathorthu is a 1998 Indian Malayalam-language film, directed by V. M. Vinu and produced by Premkumar Marath. The film stars Mukesh, Suma, Sukumari, Kalabhavan Mani and Adoor Bhavani in the lead roles. The film has musical score by Berny-Ignatius. This was Suma’s third and final Malayalam film as an actress.

Cast

Mukesh as Sreedharan
Suma Kanakala as Subhadra
Sukumari as Kalyani
Adoor Bhavani as Lakshmi
Kuthiravattam Pappu as Achuthan
Kalabhavan Mani as Varunni
Kalabhavan Narayanankutty as Jacky Vasu
Biju Menon as Kesavan Kutty
Mamukkoya as Kunjunni Nair
N. F. Varghese as Iyyancheri Padmanabhan Nair
Ponnamma Babu as Karthyayani
Santha Devi as Oppol
Shivaji Guruvayoor
T. P. Madhavan as Judge
Usharani as Janaki
Usha as Snehalatha
Priyanka as Vasanthi
Trichur Elsi
Ramadevi as Doctor

Soundtrack
The music was composed by Berny-Ignatius with lyrics by Gireesh Puthenchery.

References

External links
 

1998 films
1990s Malayalam-language films